Larry Price may refer to:
 Larry Price (Hawaii radio personality), athlete, media personality, journalist and former civil servant in Hawaii, United States
 Larry Price (politician), former member of the Ohio House of Representatives
 Larry C. Price (born 1954), United States photojournalist
 Larry Price, a character in Alias Nick Beal

See also
Lawrence Price (disambiguation)